Musicians is an oil painting by Nicolas de Staël, completed in 1953. It is currently on display at The Phillips Collection. Staël was inspired by a performance by jazz musician Sidney Bechet.

References 

1953 paintings
Oil on canvas paintings